The Segona Catalana is the seventh tier of the Spanish football league system and the second highest league in the autonomous community of Catalonia. The league was formed in 2011 to replace Territorial Preferent as second level of Catalonia and was split into 6 groups.

Structure 
The league comprises 146 teams (Group 1-A, 1-B and 8-A with 12 teams each, Groups 2, 3 and 4 with 15 teams each, Group 5 and 6 with 16 teams each, and Group 7-A, 7-B and 8-B with 11 teams each). Over the course of a season, which runs annually from September to the following June, each team plays twice against the others in the league, once at 'home' and once 'away'. Three points are awarded for a win, one for a draw and zero for a loss. The teams are ranked in the league table by points gained. In the event that two or more teams finish the season equal in all these respects, teams are separated by head-to-head points, then head-to-head goal difference, then head-to-head goals scored, then goal difference and then goals scored.

At the end of the season, the first three teams of the Groups 1-A and 1-B, 7-A and 7-B and 8-A and 8-B are qualified to a play-off phase in each province, while the top two teams of the Groups 2, 3, 4, 5 and 6 are automatically promoted to Primera Catalana. In the groups 2, 3, 4, 5 and 6, the 13th and below are relegated to Tercera Catalana, while the 12th is qualified to the relegation play-off.

Division of the groups
Group 1 (A and B): Province of Girona
Groups 2, 3 and 4 (A and B: Province of Barcelona
Group 5 (A and B): Province of Lleida
Group 6 (A and B): Province of Tarragona

Clubs 
The following 128 clubs are competing in the Segona Catalana during the 2021–22 season.

Group 1-A 

 Atlètic Bisbalenc
 Begur
 Besalú
 Empuriabrava Castelló
 La Jonquera
 Marca de L'ham
 Porqueres
 Roses
 Sant Jaume de Llierca
 Torroella
 Viladamat

Group 1-B 

 Blanes
 Ca la Guidó
 Calonge
 Cassà
 Farners
 Gironès-Sàbat
 Malgrat
 Quart
 Tordera
 Tossa
 Unió Girona

Group 2–A 

 Ametlla Vallès
 Atlético Iberia
 Júpiter
 Les Franqueses
 Lloreda
 Molletense
 Navàs
 Parc
 Racing Vallbona
 Sant Genís-Penitentes
 Singuerlín

Group 2–B 

 Argentona
 Atlètic Sant Pol
 Cardedeu
 Cirera
 Juventus-Lloret
 Llavaneres
 Masnou
 Molinos
 Premià
 Vilassar de Dalt
 Vilassar de Mar B

Group 3–A 

 Almeda
 Gornal
 Legends L'Hospitalet
 Levante Las Planas
 Marianao Poblet
 Sant Ignasi
 Sant Ildelfons
 Sporting Gavà
 Terlenka
 Unificación Bellvitge
 Valldoreix

Group 3-B 

 Atlètic Vilafranca
 Cabrils
 Cubelles
 Espluguenc
 Gavà
 Moja
 Penya Jove de Les Roquetes
 Sant Vicenç dels Horts
 Santfeliuenc B
 Sitges
 Vista Alegre

Group 4–A 

 Atlètic Gironella
 Atlètic Junior
 Berga
 Castellar
 Gurb
 Joanenc
 Puigreig
 Sant Quirze del Vallés
 Taradell
 Vic Riuprimer
 Voltregà

Group 4-B 

 Badía del Vallés
 Can Fatjó
 Can Rull Rómulo Tronchoni
 Cerdanyola del Vallès B
 Montcada
 Natació Terrassa
 Ripollet
 Sabadell Nord
 San Juan Atlético de Montcada
 San Lorenzo Terrassa
 Tibidabo Torre Romeu

Group 5-A 

 Alcarràs
 Alguaire
 Artesa de Lleida
 Balàfia
 Borges Blanques
 Juneda
 Lleida Esportiu B
 Pardinyes
 Térmens
 Torrefarrera
 Tremp

Group 5-B 

 Agramunt
 Angulària
 Artesa de Segre
 Atlètic Castellserà
 Cervera
 Guissona
 La Seu d'Urgell
 Linyola
 Organyà
 Palau d'Anglesola
 Solsona

Group 6-A 

 Atlètic Roda de Barà
 Canonja
 L'Arboç
 Jesús y María
 Morell
 Pobla de Mafumet B
 Riudoms
 Salou
 Vendrell
 Vila-seca

Group 6-B 

 Aldeana
 Ampolla
 Atlètic Mora La Nova
 Camarles
 Ebre
 La Sénia
 Jesús Catalònia
 Remolins-Bitem
 Tortosa
 Ulldecona

References

Catalan football competitions
Spain
Catalana